Frick is a German shortening of the surname "Frederick". Notable people with the surname include:

 Albert Frick (theologian) (1714–1776), German theologian
 Albert Frick (politician) (born 1948), Liechtenstein politician
 Albert Frick (skier) (born 1949), Liechtenstein Olympic alpine skier
 Alexander Frick (1910–1991), head of government of Liechtenstein
 Arnold Frick (born 1966), Liechtenstein judoka
 Aurelia Frick (born 1975), Liechtenstein government minister 
 Bruno Frick (born 1953), Swiss politician
 Carl Frick (1863–1924), Swedish sea captain, corporation leader
 Charles Frick (1823–1860), US physician
 Childs Frick (1883–1965), US vertebrate paleontologist
 Davy Frick (born 1990), German athlete in football
 Denise Frick (born 1980), South African chess player
 Ebbe Frick (fl. 1950s), Swedish athlete in sprint canoe
 Ernst Frick (footballer), Swiss athlete in 1934 FIFA World Cup of Football
 Ernst Frick (painter) (1881–1956), Swiss artist
 Ferdinand Frick (1878–1939), Austrian sculptor
 Ford Frick (1894–1978), US sportswriter, sports manager
 Frick and Frack, stage name of two Swiss skaters who moved to US in 1937: Werner Groebli (1915–2008); Hansruedi Mauch, (1919–1979)
 Gottlob Frick (1906–1994), German singer
 Henry Frick (politician) (1795–1844), US political figure
 Henry Clay Frick (1849–1919), US industrialist, financier, art patron
 Henry Clay Frick II (1919–2007), US physician and professor of medicine
 Helen Clay Frick (1888–1984), US philanthropist
 Jacob Gellert Frick (1825–1902), US Civil War Union officer
 Jim Frick (1951–2020), Swedish horse harness racer
 John Frick (born 1939), professionally known as Mark Elliott, US voice-over artist
 Karin Frick (born 1980), Swedish sports journalist and television presenter
 Mario Frick (politician) (born 1965), Liechtenstein political figure
 Mario Frick (footballer) (born 1974), Swiss-born athlete in Liechtenstein football
 Ola Frick, Swedish musician, of the duo Moonbabies
 Per Frick (born 1992), Swedish athlete in football
 Rolf Frick (1936–2008), German professor, political figure
 Sarah Viktoria Frick (born 1982), Swiss actress
 Stephen Frick (born 1964), US astronaut
 Tim Frick (born 1952), Canadian wheelchair basketball coach
 Vaughn Frick (fl. 1980s–present), US cartoonist 
 Wilhelm Frick (1877–1946), German Nazi official, executed for war crimes
 William Frick (born 1974), US political figure
 William Frick (1790–1855), justice of the Maryland Court of Appeals
 Xaver Frick (1913–2009), Liechtenstein Olympic athlete
 Yanik Frick (born 1998), Liechtenstein athlete in football

Surnames from given names
Surnames of Liechtenstein origin

German-language surnames